Pride Center or Pride Centre may refer to:
 Brooklyn Community Pride Center - A nonprofit LGBTQ+ community center in Brooklyn, New York
 LGBT community centre - Also called a "pride center"
 Pride Center of Maryland - A nonprofit organization serving the LGBT  population of Baltimore
 The Pride Center at Equality Park - A nonprofit organization serving the LGBT population of South Florida
The Pride Centre of Edmonton - An LGBT community centre in Edmonton
 Utah Pride Center - A nonprofit organization in Salt Lake City